The Milton W. Smith House is a house located in the south Portland historic district, Portland, Oregon listed on the National Register of Historic Places. Situated in a neighborhood then called Caruther's Addition, it is one of the state's earliest Colonial Revivalist-style structures and possibly the first residence to feature electricity.

See also
 National Register of Historic Places listings in Southwest Portland, Oregon

References

1891 establishments in Oregon
Colonial Revival architecture in Oregon
Historic district contributing properties in Oregon
Houses completed in 1891
Houses on the National Register of Historic Places in Portland, Oregon
Southwest Portland, Oregon
Portland Historic Landmarks